Baranovsky railway station is railway station and railway junction of Trans-Siberian Railway and Baranovsky-Khasan railway line in the village Baranovsky, Nadezhdinsky District, Primorsky Krai, Russia. It belongs to the Vladivostok branch of the Far Eastern Railway.

Moving away from single-track branch line station to Khasan railway station, further Russian track comes to Tumangang Station in North Korea. The main way of Transsib (in Khabarovsk and Vladivostok) electrified AC 25 kV (1963), the progress on the non-electrified Khasan. At the station, stop all trains and some passenger trains. Fast trains pass the station without stopping. The station receives and issue a carload freight and small shipments.

References

Railway stations in the Russian Empire opened in 1893
Railway stations in Primorsky Krai